Bostrom or Boström or Bostrem may refer to:

People
 Arthur Bostrom, English actor, most famous for his role as Officer Crabtree
 Ben Bostrom, American motorcycle racer, son of Dave Bostrom, nephew of Paul Bostrom, brother of Eric Bostrom
 Christopher Jacob Boström, Swedish philosopher
 Derrick Bostrom, American drummer
 Donald Boström, Swedish journalist, photographer and writer
 Ebba Boström (1844–1902), Swedish nurse and philanthropist
 Eric Bostrom, American professional motorcycle racer and brother of Ben Bostrom
 Erik Gustaf Boström, Swedish landowner and politician
 Erik Boström, Swedish sport shooter who competed in the 1912 Summer Olympics.
 Eugen Bostroem (1850–1928), German pathologist
 Figge Boström (born 1969), Swedish musician, songwriter, and music producer
 Harvey Bostrom, Canadian politician from Manitoba
 Helge Bostrom, Canadian professional ice hockey player
 Justin Bostrom, American professional ice hockey forward
 Kirsi Boström, Finnish orienteering competitor and World champion
 Mårten Boström, Finnish orienteering competitor and long-distance runner
 Mikael Boström, Finnish orienteering competitor
 Nick Bostrom, Swedish philosopher at Oxford
 Peter Boström, Swedish producer and songwriter
 Sixten Boström (born 1963), Finnish football midfielder
 Wollmar Boström, Swedish diplomat and tennis player 
 Zachary Bostrom, American actor

Fictional characters 
 Patrik Boström (see Andra Avenyn)
 Nilla Boström (see Andra Avenyn)

Places 
 25108 Boström, a Main Belt minor planet named after Johan Ingemar Boström
 Bostrom High School, in Phoenix Union High School District
 Bostrem Bay (see 4th Battalion (Australia))
 Eric Bostrom Three-Decker, a historic triple decker house in Worcester, Massachusetts

Concepts 
 Bostrom's tripartition (Nick Bostrom)
 Splenogonadal fusion (Eugen Bostroem)